Wonder Woman: Bloodlines is a 2019 American animated superhero film focusing on the superheroine Wonder Woman and is the fifteenth installment of the DC Animated Movie Universe and the 36th overall film of the DC Universe Animated Original Movies. The film was released on digital platforms on October 5, 2019, and was released on 4K Ultra HD and Blu-ray on October 22. It focuses on Wonder Woman facing enemies of the past who come together and form Villainy Inc.

Plot

In 2013, Princess Diana of Themyscira - home island of the warrior race the Amazons - rescues US pilot Captain Steve Trevor from a Parademon attack. Diana treats Steve with a purple healing ray before he is taken prisoner by Diana's mother Queen Hippolyta due to Diana breaking the island's “no men” law. However, Diana breaks Steve out and sees an omen about an otherworldly invasion facilitated by his arrival. When Hippolyta demands Steve's re-incarceration, Diana defies her before leaving to protect man's world, prompting Hippolyta to disown her own daughter. Diana and Steve arrive in Washington, D.C. where Etta Candy takes them to geologist Julia Kapatelis. While there, Diana meets Julia's daughter Vanessa, who grows jealous of Diana when her mother spends more time with Diana than her. Diana decides to stay in man's world and protect it as the superheroine “Wonder Woman”. Five years later, Julia requests help from Diana and Steve to find Vanessa, who has stolen an artifact from her superior Veronica Cale and plans to trade it with the villainous Doctor Poison. Diana, Steve and Julia intervene but are confronted by Poison's soldiers and Giganta, who uses an enhancement serum, but is ultimately defeated. During the battle, however, Julia is fatally shot in a crossfire, and Poison escapes with the artifact. Vanessa blames Diana for her mother's death before fleeing.

While visiting her mother's grave, Vanessa is recruited by Doctor Poison and Doctor Cyber, who transform Vanessa into Silver Swan. Meanwhile, Diana and Steve locate Poison in Qurac. The two travel there using a stealth jet provided by Etta. Upon arrival, they are attacked by Silver Swan, who Diana realizes is Vanessa and is defeated while Poison escapes with a prototype bioweapon. Diana and Steve take the unconscious Vanessa to Cale Pharmaceuticals. While there, Diana believes the purple healing ray can reverse Vanessa's transformation, but does not remember the location of Themyscira due to a mystic block. Cale reveals to Princess Diana and Steve that Julia has been researching the island as a personal pet project. Diana finds a clue in Julia's former office that she must drink water from a fountain located at the temple of Pasiphaë to regain her knowledge of the location.

In the temple, Princess Diana and Steve are suddenly confronted by Cheetah, who is now part of a team of supervillains called Villainy Inc. led by Poison and Cyber, who also uses a serum similar to Giganta's. Steve and Etta enter the maze in the temple, where they encounter and defeat a Minotaur. Diana subdues Cheetah, reunites with Steve and Etta, and drinks the fountain's water, finally regaining her memory. Diana also realizes that the Minotaur was enchanted to defend the fountain, and destroys it. By doing so, the Minotaur is set free and is named "Ferdinand" by Steve.

The trio make it back to Cale Pharmaceuticals, where they pinpoint Themyscira's location. However, they are interrupted by Cyber, who reveals their organization's plan to steal the Amazon's technological artifacts for personal gain. Cyber reactivates Vanessa to attack Diana while the others escape. Eventually, Diana defeats Vanessa and manages to let her friends escape, while Vanessa flees. With the new information they have, Diana and Steve return to Themyscira, only to find it already under siege by Villainy Inc. Vanessa distracts the heroes as Cyber and Poison unleash their endgame weapon Medusa. Medusa refuses to be under their control and destroys Cyber's mechanical body. Poison offers Medusa an enhancement serum to win her favor, but Medusa turns her to stone and takes it anyway. Growing bigger and stronger, she starts destroying the city and killing Amazons. Confronting Medusa and getting badly beaten, Diana uses the gorgon's venom to blind herself, allowing her to meet Medusa head-on. Diana is battered to the ground but saved by Vanessa, who is inspired by Diana's self-sacrifice, and together they kill Medusa. In the aftermath, Vanessa and Queen Hippolyta reconcile with Princess Diana. Queen Hippolyta presents her daughter as the champion of Themyscira and decides to open Themyscira to the outside world.

In a mid-credits scene, Princess Diana returns to Washington where she confronts Cale. Cale reveals herself to be the true mastermind behind Villainy Inc. and the one who killed Julia. Cale claims she will invade Themyscira again to profit from the Amazons' technology, but Diana accepts her challenge as she is now the protector of Themyscira and impales her sword to her desk. Diana leaves confidently as a horrified and vengeful Cale vainly tries to remove the sword.

Voice cast

Production
Wonder Woman: Bloodlines was announced at San Diego Comic-Con held in July 2018.

Rosario Dawson reprises the role of Wonder Woman from previous films. Other cast include Jeffrey Donovan as Steve Trevor, Marie Avgeropoulos as Vanessa Kapatelis/Silver Swan, Kimberly Brooks as Cheetah and Giganta, Michael Dorn as Ferdinand, Ray Chase as the lead bandit, Mozhan Marnò as Doctor Cyber, Adrienne C. Moore as Etta Candy, Courtenay Taylor as Doctor Poison, Nia Vardalos as Julia Kapatelis, and Constance Zimmer as Veronica Cale.

Release
The film was released as a World Premiere film during New York Comic Con on October 5, 2019, and also released on digital platforms on the same day, and was released on 4K Ultra HD and Blu-ray on October 22.

Reception

Critical reception
IGN gave the film a rating of 6.5/10.

Sales
The film earned $1,703,906 from domestic Blu-ray sales.

Notes

References

External links
 
 Wonder Woman: Bloodlines at The World's Finest

2010s English-language films
2010s American animated films
2010s direct-to-video animated superhero films
2010s animated superhero films
2019 animated films
2019 films
2019 direct-to-video films
Animated action films
Animated films based on DC Comics
Animated films based on classical mythology
Animated superheroine films
Wonder Woman films
DC Animated Movie Universe
2019 science fiction action films
American science fiction action films
Animated science fiction films
Warner Bros. Animation animated films
Warner Bros. direct-to-video animated films
Films about size change
Films scored by Frederik Wiedmann
Films set on fictional islands
Films produced by Sam Register
Films set in 2013
Films set in 2019
Toonami
Minotaur
Films directed by Sam Liu